Regla María Cárdeñas Telo (born 21 January 1975 in Cárdenas, Matanzas) is a retired Cuban heptathlete.

Achievements

References

External links

sports-reference
Picture of Regla Cárdenas

1975 births
Living people
People from Cárdenas, Cuba
Cuban heptathletes
Athletes (track and field) at the 1996 Summer Olympics
Olympic athletes of Cuba
Central American and Caribbean Games silver medalists for Cuba
Competitors at the 1993 Central American and Caribbean Games
Central American and Caribbean Games medalists in athletics